Luke Daniel Holland  (born June 14, 1993) is an American drummer, most popular for his YouTube videos.

Biography
He was born in Peoria, Arizona. Despite his father being a professional drummer, Holland gained interest in the drums after hearing his neighbor playing at the age of 10. Around the same time, he bought his first drum kit, having saved up enough money after mowing lawns for a year. Self-taught, he played the snare drum in his high school marching band for a year and a half at Peoria High School throughout 2007 and 2008.

At the age of 15, after playing for local band Oceans Will Part, Holland took to self-promotion online, making a YouTube account in July 2009, under the name LukeHollandDrums where he started to post drum covers and remixes. At the age of 16, Holland got a chance to stand-in as the drummer for Texas in July. Around the same time, his YouTube page was noticed by Josh Chomik, a fellow YouTuber known for his comedy music. His popularity increased immensely, going from a thousand subscribers to over nine thousand subscribers plus in a few days. From 2009 to 2016, Holland's YouTube channel has reached over 620,000+ subscribers, and over 55 million views.

Apart from YouTube, Holland is known for being a past member of metalcore band The Word Alive. He played in the band from early 2012 to late 2016, leaving to pursue more activity on his YouTube channel, session work, giving drum lessons, and occasional touring.

In 2013, Holland was voted third on Alternative Press' Drummer of the Year, and second for Modern Drummer's Up & Coming.

In 2014, Holland along with Issues vocalist Tyler Carter contributed a cover of Paramore's hit song "Ain't It Fun" for the Fearless compilation Punk Goes Pop Vol. 6.

Holland worked as a session drummer for I See Stars on their album, Treehouse, which was released in June 2016.

Holland was featured on Jason Richardson's debut album I, which was released in July 2016.

In 2017, Holland formed a new band The Evening with Elijah Trey and former guitarist of From First to Last, Taylor Larson.

In mid 2017, Holland played drums for Playboi Carti's performance in the Jimmy Kimmel Live! show.

On July 10, 2019, Jeremy Renner uploaded the music video for his single, "Main Attraction", featuring Holland as his drummer.

On September 13, 2019, rock band Starset released their album Divisions, with Holland on drums for the entire album.

Luke Holland has also appeared as the drummer in the music video for Falling in Reverse-"Zombified" alongside the main vocalist and only permanent member, Ronnie Radke and Wes Horton. He is also their current touring drummer, although he has not been named a permanent member.

In February 2022, Holland and Jason Richardson released the music video for "Upside Down", from their upcoming 2nd album, II (Due to be released in July 2022). In March, "Ishimura" was released, and in April, "p00mbachu" was released. Both songs are on the upcoming album.

Endorsements 
 Meinl Percussion Cymbals
 DW Drums
Meinl Stick and Brush 
 Remo Drumheads

Gear 
Drums: DW (Drum Workshop) 4pcs Collector Series Custom Kit (w/ full maple shell, Rose Gold Hardware and Natural Over Mapa Burl finish) :
 14" X 6.5" Snare
 12" X 8" Rack Tom
 16" X 14" Floor Tom
 22" X 18" Bass Drum

Hardwares: DW(Drum Workshop):
 DW 9002 XF Double Bass Drum Pedal
 DW DWCP9500TB 9000 series hi hat stand

Cymbals: Meinl Cymbals:
 14" Pure Alloy Traditional Hats
 8" Byzance Traditional Splash
 18" Pure Alloy Medium Crash
 19" Byzance Traditional Crash
 22" Mb20 Heavy Ride
 16" Byzance Trash China
 Luke Holland Signature Bullet Stack
 16" Byzance Vintage Trash Crash
 12" Classics Custom Trash Splash
 Luke Holland Signature Baby Stack

Drumsticks: Meinl Stick and Brush:
 Luke Holland Signature Stick 

Drumheads: Remo Drumheads:
 Snare Drumheads : Powerstroke 77 (Batter/Top), Ambassador(Resonant/Bottom)
 Tom-tom Drumheads : Clear/Vintage Emperor or Powerstroke 4 (Batter/Top), Ambassador(Resonant/Bottom)
 Bass Drumhead : Controlled Sound Black Dot (Batter/Back), Standard DW Resonant Head (Resonant/Front)

Videos 
From 2009 to 2016, Holland's YouTube videos have gained over a few hundred thousand views to a few million views each.

Holland's most popular YouTube video is his drum remix of Skrillex's "Cinema" (titled on YouTube as Luke Holland – Skrillex – Cinema Drum Remix), which has grossed over 5.2 million views since January 12, 2012.

Some of Hollands's other popular YouTube videos (based on their viewership) include:
"Like A G6" (by Far East Movement) Drum Cover. Posted on November 14, 2010, with 1.4 million views.
"Look at Me Now" (by Chris Brown, featuring Busta Rhymes and Lil Wayne) Drum Cover. Posted on April 24, 2011, with 1.5 million views.
"Upside Down" (by Bassnectar) Drum Remix.  Posted April 11, 2012, with 1.1 million views.
"Goin' In" (By Skrillex (Birdy Nam Nam) Drum Remix.  Posted September 21, 2012, with 1.7 million views.
"Misery Business" (by Paramore) Drum Cover.  Posted November 7, 2012, with 1.6 million views.
"Ignorance" (by Paramore) Drum Cover.  Posted January 7, 2013, with 1.2 million views.
"Bittersweet" (by Ellie Goulding) Drum Remix.  Posted May 11, 2013, with 1.9 million views.
"Fine China" (Originally by Chris Brown) with Tyler Carter.  Posted October 8, 2013, with 1 million views.
"Physical Education" (by Animals As Leaders) Drum Cover.  Posted September 5, 2014, with 1 million views.
"Where Are Ü Now" (by Skrillex & Diplo of Jack Ü, featuring Justin Bieber) Drum Remix.  Posted April 5, 2015, with 1.2 million views.

Discography 
 Oceans Will Part – Obsidian Resolve (Self-released, 2010)
 The Word Alive – Real (Fearless, 2014)
 The Word Alive – Dark Matter (Fearless, 2016)
 I See Stars – Treehouse (Sumerian, 2016)
 Jason Richardson – I (2016)
 Starset – Divisions (2019)
 Hollywood Undead – New Empire, Vol. 1 (2020)
 Hollywood Undead – New Empire, Vol. 2 (2020)
 Jason Richardson & Luke Holland – II (2022)
 Miss Fortune – TBA

Other appearances
 Punk Goes Pop Vol. 6 – Contributed a cover of Paramore's song "Ain't It Fun" with Issues lead vocalist Tyler Carter
 How It Feels to Be Lost – Contributed drums on Sleeping with Sirens song, "Blood Lines"
 Live From The Unknown – Contributed drums on Falling in Reverse live streamed shows.

References 

American drummers
Living people
1993 births
People from Peoria, Arizona
21st-century American drummers